Eitan (lit. Enduring) is a national-religious moshav in south-central Israel. Located in the southern Shephelah, it falls under the jurisdiction of Shafir Regional Council.

Etymology
The name is taken from the biblical verse Numbers 24:21; "...Enduring is your dwelling place ...".

History
The village was established in 1955 by Jewish immigrants from Tunisia.

References

Moshavim
Religious Israeli communities
Populated places established in 1955
Populated places in Southern District (Israel)
Tunisian-Jewish culture in Israel
1955 establishments in Israel